Pain Zoghal Manzel (also Romanized as Pā’īn Zoghāl Manzel; also known as Zoghāl Manzel) is a village in Chapakrud Rural District, Gil Khuran District, Juybar County, Mazandaran Province, Iran. At the 2006 census, its population was 373, in 90 families.

References 

Populated places in Juybar County